Amedeo Benedetti  (22 September 1954, in Fivizzano, Tuscany – 18 April 2017) was an Italian scholar and writer.

Life
He graduated in Classical Literature, in History and in Philosophy at the University of Genoa. 
Later he became literature and history teacher in a High School, an activity he continued until his death.

Benedetti spent more time writing. He has written essays on the language of important international characters, such as Silvio Berlusconi, Henry Kissinger, and Pope Benedict XVI alias Joseph Ratzinger.

His numerous studies about language have helped to promote an awareness in Italy of officialese, journalese, legalese, medical jargon, pidgin, political jargon, and of terrorist organisations (Red Brigades).

He further was an essayist and columnist for many journals, as “Lettere italiane”, “Esperienze letterarie”, “Otto/Novecento”, “Rivista di Studi Politici Internazionali”, “Critica letteraria”, and others.

Works
 Il comportamento televisivo, Genova, Regione Liguria, 1996.
 Il comportamento radiofonico, Genova, Regione Liguria, 1996.
 Comunicazione e osservazione per musicoterapeuti, Genova, Associazione Italiana Studi di Musicoterapia, 1997.
 Il programma dell’Accesso, Genova, Erga, 1999. 
 Storia dei programmi televisivi di maggior audience, Genova, Erga, 1999. 
 Gli archivi delle immagini. Fototeche, cineteche e videoteche in Italia, Genova, Erga, 2000. 
 Gli archivi sonori. Fonoteche, nastroteche e biblioteche musicali in Italia, Genova, Erga, 2002 
 Il linguaggio delle nuove Brigate Rosse, Genova, Erga, 2002. 
 Il cinema documentato. Cineteche, musei del cinema e biblioteche cinematografiche in Italia, Genova, Cineteca Griffith, 2002.
 (with Bruno Benedetti) Gli archivi della scienza. Musei e biblioteche della scienza e della tecnologia in Italia, Genova, Erga, 2003. 
 L’osservazione per l'intelligence e l'indagine, Genova, Erga, 2003. 
 Decisione e persuasione per l'intelligence (e la politica), Genova, Erga, 2004. 
 Bibliografia artigianato. La manualistica artigiana del Novecento: pubblicazioni su arti e mestieri in Italia dall'Unità ad oggi, Genova, Erga, 2004. 
 Il linguaggio e la retorica della nuova politica italiana: Silvio Berlusconi e Forza Italia, Genova, Erga, 2004. 
 Lezioni di politica di Henry Kissinger. Linguaggio, pensiero ed aforismi del più abile politico di fine Novecento, Genova, Erga, 2005. 
 Bibliografia ragionata sulla cultura delle immagini, Genova, Erga, 2005. 
 Il libro. Storia, tecnica, strutture, Arma di Taggia, Atene, 2006. 
 Manuale di sburocrazia. Analisi, note e proposte di correzione del linguaggio burocratico italiano,  Genova, Aba Libri, 2008. 
 Bancarese addio! Proposte di correzione del linguaggio bancario italiano, Genova, Aba Libri, 2008. 
 Il linguaggio di Benedetto XVI, al secolo Joseph Ratzinger, Genova, Erga, 2012. 
 Dica trentatre. Analisi, note e proposte di correzione del “medichese”, Genova, Erga, 2012. 
 Mi rimetto alla clemenza della corte. Analisi, note e proposte di correzione del linguaggio giuridico italiano, Genova, Erga, 2012.

References

External links
 writer’s website

1954 births
2017 deaths
Italian essayists
Italian male non-fiction writers
Italian columnists
Historians of Italy
Male essayists